The Spirit of Christmas 2008 is part of the Spirit of Christmas album series.

Track listing
Myer Grace Bros (Australian department store chain) 
Have Yourself a Merry Little Christmas - Ricki Lee
Santa Baby - Kate Ceberano
Nothing But a Child - Kasey Chambers & Shane Nicholson
Silent Night - Archie Roach
This Christmas - Damien Leith
O Holy Night - Olivia Newton-John
It's Beginning To Look A Lot Like Christmas - Carl Riseley
The Christmas Song - Katie Noonan
The Rebel Jesus - Glenn Shorrock
Christmas (Baby Please Come Home) - Mahalia Barnes & The Soul Mates
All I Want for Christmas Is You - Dean Geyer 
2000 Miles - Paris Wells
The Twelve Days of Christmas - University Of Newcastle Chamber Choir
The Virgin Mary Had a Baby Boy - The Rudolphs
Hallelujah Chorus - The Sydney Salvos Staff Songsters

References 

2008 Christmas albums
Christmas albums by Australian artists
The Spirit of Christmas albums
2008 compilation albums